Comitas galatheae, common name the galatheae turrid, is a species of sea snail, a marine gastropod mollusc in the family Pseudomelatomidae, the turrids and allies

Description
The length of the shell attains 105 mm.

Distribution
This marine species occurs off the Aru Islands, eastern Indonesia and Western Australia

References

  Powell, A.W.B. 1969. The family Turridae in the Indo-Pacific. Part. 2. The subfamily Turriculinae. Indo-Pacific Mollusca 2(10): 207–415, pls 188–324
 Kosuge, S 1986. Report of the family Turridae collected along the north-western coast of Australia (Gastropoda) (1). Bulletin of the Institute of Malacology, Tokyo 2(5): 80-90 
 Wilson, B. 1994. Australian marine shells. Prosobranch gastropods. Kallaroo, WA : Odyssey Publishing Vol. 2 370 pp.
 Sysoev, A.V. 1997. Mollusca Gastropoda: new deep-water turrid gastropods (Conoidea) from eastern Indonesia. Mémoires du Muséum national d'Histoire naturelle, Paris (N.S.) [1993-2016] série A, Zoologie 172: 325–355

External links
 
 
 Biolib.cz: Comitas galatheae

galatheae
Gastropods described in 1969